The 1972–73 season was Liverpool Football Club's 81st season in existence and their 11th consecutive season in the First Division. After seven years of not winning any trophies, Liverpool won both the Football League and the UEFA Cup in an extremely successful season, the highlight of Bill Shankly's managerial career. The rebuilding of the team from the one that served so well in the 1960s had been fully realised.

The league which they came so close to winning the year before, had finally been conquered by winning the title by three points from Arsenal. The signing of Peter Cormack from Nottingham Forest during the summer of 1972 would also be another great signing. On 30 December 1972 Liverpool beat Crystal Palace at Anfield to make it 21 consecutive home wins in the league. This was the longest run in English top-flight history until it was surpassed by Jürgen Klopp’s Liverpool who made it 22 consecutive home wins in March 2020.

The UEFA Cup would also be the beginning of their dominance of regularly winning European trophies as well, overcoming the previous season's winners Tottenham Hotspur in the semi-finals and Borussia Mönchengladbach over a two legged final 3-2 on aggregate.

The emergence of Kevin Keegan and Ray Clemence in the team would also see them start their international careers, with them both making their England debuts in the World Cup qualifier against Wales on 15 November 1972, alongside Emlyn Hughes already established in the England team.

Squad

Goalkeepers
  Ray Clemence
  Frankie Lane
  Grahame Lloyd

Defenders
  Steve Arnold
  Roy Evans
  Chris Lawler
  Alec Lindsay
  Larry Lloyd
  John McLaughlin
  Ian Ross
  Tommy Smith
  Trevor Storton
  John Webb

Midfielders
  Ian Callaghan
  Peter Cormack
  Brian Hall
  Steve Heighway
  Emlyn Hughes
  Hughie McAuley
  Phil Thompson
  Peter Thompson

Attackers
  Phil Boersma
  Derek Brownbill
  Kevin Keegan
  Kevin Kewley
  John Toshack
  Jack Whitham

League table

Results

First Division

Football League Cup

FA Cup

UEFA Cup

Final

First Leg

Second Leg

References
 LFC History.net – 1972–73 season
 Liverweb - 1972-73 Season
 LFC in Europe

Liverpool F.C. seasons
Liverpool
English football championship-winning seasons
UEFA Europa League-winning seasons